Useless Bay may refer to:

Useless Bay (Georgia), a swamp in Georgia
Useless Bay (Washington), a bay in Washington
Inútil Bay, or "Useless Bay", a bay of Chile